Maurice Revelli (born September 4, 1964) is a Monegasque former professional footballer who played as a defender.

See also
Football in Monaco
List of football clubs in Monaco

References

External links
Maurice Revelli profile at chamoisfc79.fr

1964 births
Living people
Monegasque footballers
Association football defenders
AS Monaco FC players
Chamois Niortais F.C. players
Ligue 1 players
Ligue 2 players